Arne Wegner Haaland (28 October 1923 – 23 June 2012) was a Norwegian engineer.

He was born in Lunde, Telemark and graduated as a civil engineer from the Norwegian Institute of Technology. In 1955 he was hired by Veidekke to construct an airfield in Ethiopia, and two years later he was contracted to a project in Brazil by the company Furuholmen. He returned to Veidekke in 1960, and served as its chief executive officer from 1962 to 1989. He continued as a board member until 1995. He died in June 2012.

References

1923 births
2012 deaths
People from Telemark
People from Lunde, Telemark
Norwegian Institute of Technology alumni
Norwegian engineers
Norwegian businesspeople
Norwegian expatriates in Ethiopia
Norwegian expatriates in Brazil